Pavel Umurzakov (uzb. Pavel Petrovich Umurzakov born 8 November 1976 in Kyrgyzstan) is a professional bodybuilder, absolute champion of Uzbekistan in 2014, 2016 and absolute champion of Central Asia in 2017, 2 x Champion of Asia (ABBF-WBPF) in 2015, 2018 and  4 x World Bodybuilding and Fitness Champion  (WBPF) in 2021, 2019, 2018, 2016 years.

Biography 
Pavel Umurzakov was born in Jalalabad, Kyrgyzstan. In 1989, he moved with his family to Tashkent. His sports career began when he was 30 years old, before his bodybuilding career he got into hand-to-hand combat fight and oriental martial arts Jeet Kune Do that was conceived by Bruce Lee. Umurzakov won 1st place in his first national tournament when he was 35 years old. In 2014, he participiated at international tournament and won gold medal of tournier that held in Kazakhstan. Umurzakovs is the first World Champion in bodybuilding in the history of Uzbekistan. He won the "gold" of the World Championship in Thailand in 2016. In 2022, he obtained his the best medal of Bodybuilding career at Arnold Classic (NPC-IFBB) by winning category over 35 in light heavyweight division that held in Columbus, Ohio.

Family 
He is married and his wife Olesya Gureeva is also a professional bodybuilder and mas-wrestler, winner of Arnold Classic 2022.

Anthropometry 
•             Height: 5 ft 62 in (172  cm)

•             Off Season Weight: 105–107 kg

•             Competition Weight: 90 kg

•             Upper Arm Size: 47–50 cm

•             Chest: 52in  30 cm

•             Thigh Size: 75 cm

•             Waist Size: 85 cm

•             Calf Size: 47 cm

Competitions

References

External links 

 Official website

1976 births
Living people
Uzbekistani bodybuilders
Male bodybuilders
Professional bodybuilders